The term Non State Actors (NSAs) is used as a substitute for the term Civil Society within the scope of the Cotonou Partnership Agreement (CPA), an international trading agreement between the ACP Group of States and the European Union (EU), signed in the year 2000 and valid until 2020. Up until 2007, the NSAs were virtually shut out of the CPA in the seventy nine ACP States and hence the concept of the NSA Panel came out of studying the technical aspects of the CPA to see how best the NSA could participate in Development Cooperation. The Non State Actors Advisory Panel or NSA Panel is an example of how NSAs or civil society can benefit and participate in national development within the CPA in the seventy-nine ACP States. Seven Panels were created in Barbados and the Organisation of Eastern Caribbean States (OECS) to launch this initiative.

The importance of the initiative is to encourage citizens' participation in national decision-making and implementation of development projects in these seventy-nine developing and under-developed countries. The critical nature of the Panel is that it is a forum where government, NSAs and the EU meet to discuss, negotiate and make decisions on initiatives for national development. These are all supported by the EU with technical assistance from the respective Governments as part of the Development Cooperation aspect of the CPA.

The NSA Panel of Barbados was established in 2006 (along with the other six Panels) by way of a Memorandum of Understanding (MoU) between the Government of Barbados (which is represented by the National Authorising Officer, usually the Permanent Secretary in the Ministry of Economic Affairs) and the European Union (through the European Commission Delegation to Barbados and the OECS). It consists of 14 NSAs, Representatives from the EU and the National Authorising Officer )in each of the countries). Attendance at meetings of all three parties is very critical, because no decisions can be implemented without agreement between the government and the EU. Basically, these two hear from the NSAs and implement NSA programmes.

The objective of the Panel, as stated in the MoU, is to promote the participation of the non state actors in national development through the instruments of Development Cooperation established with the European Union (EU) under the Cotonou Partnership Agreement, to which Barbados is a signatory along with the other 78 countries that make up the ACP (Africa, Caribbean and Pacific) Group of Countries.

The MoU describes Non State Actors as follows: “Organisations that bring together the principal existing or emerging structures of the society outside the government and public administration. They are created voluntarily by citizens, their aim being to promote any issue of interest, either general or specific. They are independent of the State and can be profit or non-profit making organisations”

Duration of the Panel
The life of the Panel is two years after which a new Panel is appointed. Member organizations of the Panel hold office for a maximum of two years and can be reappointed for a maximum of two additional consecutive years. At the end of every term of two years, the Panel provides written advice to the Government and the Delegation on a proposed Panel composition for the following term. The Panel cannot be dissolved at changes of Government or without the written consent of the Government and the Delegation.

Support to the Panel
The Government and the Delegation agree to provide logistical support to the Panel. They also agree to attend the meetings of the Panel at least every six months and agree to annually discuss with the Panel how its advice has been considered in formulating policies, strategies, and other decision making.

Scope of the Panel
The scope of the Panel is to facilitate deeper involvement of civil society in the Barbados/European Union partnership. It is expected that the Panel will participate in political dialogue, policy dialogue, and programming/review of European Union development aid and provide advice on other matters related to Barbados/ European Union partnership as jointly requested by the Government and the Delegation or determined by the Panel.

The Panel shall provide advice to the Government and the Delegation on matters described above through joint discussions with the Government and the Delegation or by other means, e.g. written reports as may be decided by the Panel.

Activities
The Panel is required to meet at least once every quarter however it has been meeting once every month from inception. The Panel is supported by a Secretariat (BANGO) which performs the administrative role on behalf of the Panel. The Secretariat liaises with both the EU and the NAO's Office. Whenever the Panel meets, the Secretariat, EU representatives and representatives from the NAO's Office are always present. While these three entities are not members of the Panel, it is difficult for the Panel to meet even without one of them because of the level of support that is required.

The three main projects of the Panel so far are:
 The NGO Management Certificate Programme, a one-year programme designed to certify NGO managers and workers;
 Grant Fund 2013, which gave maximum grants to NSAs for projects up to BDS$25,000.00;
 Assisting BANGO with the establishment of a Web Portal for NGOs.

Members of the Barbados Panel (2013-2015)
BANGO - Rodney Grant, Marcia Brandon
BARNUFO - Alvin Cummins, Vernel Nicholls
Barbados Employers Confederation - Tony Walcott, Brittany Brathwaite
Barbados Council for the Disabled - Joseph Tudor
Bajan Culture Village - Roy Byer, Peter Brito
Barbados National Trust - Tony Thomas
Small Business Association - Andrea Taylor, Lynette Holder
Barbados Youth Business Trust - Samuel Lev. Gittens Jr
Barbados Youth Development Council - Melissa Goring
Congress of Trade Unions and Staff Associations - Dwane Goddard
Caribbean Youth Environment Network - Reggie Burke
Ichigouranaim Council for the Advancement of Rastafari - Carl Talma, Ronald Alleyne
Men's Education Support Association - Ralph Boyce, Stanley Medford
Marcus Garvey Resource & Development Centre - Sophia Broome
National Union of Farmers - Keeley Holder, Julian Dottin
PAREDOS - Marcia Graham, Althea Louis
The National Authorising Officer
Representatives of the European Union

NSA Panels in the Caribbean Region
In 2006, Non State Actors Advisory Panels were established simultaneously in the following territories of the Eastern Caribbean:
Antigua
Barbados
Dominica
Grenada
St. Kitts
St. Lucia
St. Vincent

Contact can be made with the Panels through the National Authorising Officers in the respective countries, usually located in Ministries of Finance and/or Economic Affairs/Planning.

References

Non-profit organisations based in Barbados